Woodhull is a village in Henry County, Illinois. As of the 2010 census, the village had a population of 811, up from 809 in 2000.

History
The town was laid out by Maxwell Woodhull on September 30, 1857. An addition was laid out in 1867, and another in 1870. That same year, the town was incorporated. In 1994, the High School girl’s basketball team almost made history in the I.H.S.A. Basketball state championship but came up short.

Geography
Woodhull is located at  (41.1785893, -90.3219500).

Demographics

As of the census of 2000, there were 809 people, 348 households, and 238 families living in the village. The racial makeup of the village was 99% White, 0.4% African American, 0.1% Native American, 0.1% Asian, and 0.4% from two or more races. Hispanic or Latino of any race were 1.2% of the population.

There were 348 households, out of which 28.2% had children under the age of 18 living with them, 57.5% were married couples living together, 7.8% had a female householder with no husband present, and 31.6% were non-families. 29.6% of all households were made up of individuals, and 15.8% had someone living alone who was 65 years of age or older. The average household size was 2.32 and the average family size was 2.86.

In the village, the population was spread out, with 23.9% under the age of 18, 6.4% from 18 to 24, 28.1% from 25 to 44, 23.5% from 45 to 64, and 18.2% who were 65 years of age or older. The median age was 40 years. For every 100 females, there were 94.5 males. For every 100 females age 18 and over, there were 92.5 males.

The median income for a household in the village was $35,288, and the median income for a family was $42,500. Males had a median income of $30,000 versus $26,136 for females. The per capita income for the village was $18,738. About 5.4% of families and 9.1% of the population were below the poverty line, including 10.7% of those under age 18 and 12.3% of those age 65 or over.

Education
AlWood Middle-High School is located in Woodhull, with students coming from nearby Alpha after the merger in the early 1950s. Students also attend from the country surrounding Ophiem, Lynn Center, Andover, Cambridge, New Windsor, Rio, and Oneida. The school's mascot is the Aces, although it has been referred to as the "Flying Aces" numerous times.

Notable people
 Don Samuelson, 25th Governor of Idaho from 1967 to 1971; born in Woodhull.
 Daniel Swanson, Illinois state representative; born in Woodhull.

References

External links
 City-Data.com Comprehensive Statistical Data and more about Woodhull
 ePodunk: Profile for Woodhull, Illinois, IL

Villages in Henry County, Illinois
Villages in Illinois